Henry Ellis Daniels FRS (2 October 1912 – 16 April 2000) was a British statistician. He was President of the Royal Statistical Society (1974–1975), and was awarded its Guy Medal in Gold in 1984, following a silver medal in 1947. He became a Fellow of the Royal Society of London in 1980. The Parry-Daniels map is named after him (together with the English mathematician Bill Parry).

Daniels' family was Jewish, of Russian (partly Polish and partly Lithuanian) origin. He was educated at George Heriot's School. He subsequently graduated from the University of Edinburgh (PhD 1943) and went on to further study at Clare College, Cambridge (B.A. 1935). In 1957, he became the first Professor of Mathematical Statistics at the University of Birmingham. He stayed at the university till his retirement in 1978. After retirement, he went to Cambridge and lived there until his death. He died at Royal Shrewsbury Hospital, having suffered a "massive stroke" at breakfast time the previous day. His funeral was officiated, at his request, by a humanist.

The watchmaker George Daniels (no relation) enlisted Daniels' help with the equations required for the design of his Space Traveller's Watch.

In 1950, Daniels married Barbara Pickering; together, they had two children.

Selected publications by Daniels

References

External links

 Papers and biographical sketch
 Photograph
 The History of the Cambridge Statistical Laboratory 

1912 births
2000 deaths
British Jews
Jewish scientists
British statisticians
British people of Polish-Jewish descent
British people of Lithuanian-Jewish descent
British people of Russian-Jewish descent
Alumni of the University of Edinburgh
Alumni of Clare College, Cambridge
Academics of the University of Birmingham
Fellows of King's College, Cambridge
Fellows of the Royal Society
Presidents of the Royal Statistical Society
20th-century British mathematicians
Mathematical statisticians